Jorge Muñoz Cristi (1898–1967) was a Chilean geologist active at the University of Chile. He obtained a degree in mining engineering in 1929, and stated to lecture in 1943. He was director of the Instituto de Geología in 1952.

Muñoz Cristi was a student of Juan Brüggen.

References
MIEMBROS  ACADÉMICOS  DE  LA  FACULTAD  DE  CIENCIAS  FÍSICAS  Y MATEMÁTICAS DE LA UNIVERSIDAD DE CHILE

20th-century Chilean geologists
Academic staff of the University of Chile
Petrologists
1898 births
1967 deaths